Irina Pantaeva (born 31 October 1967) is a Russian model and actress. Pantaeva was born in Ulan-Ude, Buryat ASSR, Russian SFSR, Soviet Union.

Biography
Irina Pantaeva started working as a model with designer Larisa Dagdanova in 1988 in Ulan-Ude. She participated in several fashion shows with ″Larissa″ collection in China. In 1989 she won the first-ever beauty contest in Buryatia, ″Miss Ulan-Ude″. Later that same year she went to Moscow to the audition for Vozvrashchenie Khodzhi Nasreddina movie, and filming afterwards. 

In 1992, she moved to Paris to pursue her modeling career. She succeeded in getting an appointment with Karl Lagerfeld, that allowed her to join in his fashion show and the world of haute couture. Pantaeva signed a contract with  "The Marilyn Agency″. In 1994, Pantaeva moved to New York City to further her career, and later appeared in Mortal Kombat: Annihilation, as Jade, As Far as My Feet Will Carry Me and bit parts in Celebrity, Zoolander and People I Know, in addition to filming a guest appearance on 3rd Rock from the Sun. She also featured in the off-Broadway play Jewtopia.  While in New York City, she graduated from the theatre department at New York University.

Pantaeva walked runways for renowned designers and fashion houses, such as: Christian Dior, Versace, Alexander McQueen, Thierry Mugler, Issey Miyake, John Galliano, Yves Saint Laurent, Anna Sui, Chloé, Kenzo, appeared in fashion campaigns for Calvin Klein, GAP, Kenzo, Missoni, Levi's Jeans, and was presented on covers of the fashion magazines: Vogue, Harper's Bazaar, Elle, etc. In the second half of the 1990s, she was one of the favourite models of English fashion designer Vivienne Westwood. In 1998, she was a Sports Illustrated swimsuit model and wrote her autobiography Siberian Dream: A Memoir, which was published by Avon/Bard.

Personal life
In 1989, Pantaeva had a son, Ruslan. In 1994, she married the Latvian photographer Roland Levin, from whom in 2003 she gave birth to a son, Solongo. In 2008, Pantaeva and Levin divorced.

Filmography

Film

Television

References

Bibliography

External links

1967 births
Living people
American female models
American film actresses
American people of Buryat descent
American television actresses
Buryat people
People from Ulan-Ude
Russian emigrants to the United States
Russian female models
Russian film actresses
Russian television actresses
20th-century American actresses
20th-century Russian actresses
21st-century American actresses
21st-century Russian actresses